Johns Hopkins Medicine International (JHMI), not to be confused with Johns Hopkins Medical Institute, also (JHMI), is a partnership program established by the Johns Hopkins School of Medicine to raise the standard of health care through long-term, mission-driven agreements.

Types of partnerships

Hospital Management
In a Hospital Management program, JHMI oversees the partner institution’s daily operations at an executive level. Examples include:

Al Rahba Hospital, United Arab Emirates
Tawam Hospital, UAE

Clinical Operation
JHMI oversees the partner institution’s clinical operations:

Tawam Molecular Imaging Center, United Arab Emirates

Affiliations
Affiliated institutions have a Hopkins faculty member appointed as a part-time medical director to assess, promote and monitor medical quality and safety
 HCL Avitas, India
 Amcare Labs International, Inc.
 Anadolu Medical Center, Turkey
 Clemenceau Medical Center, Lebanon
 Clínica Las Condes, Chile
 Pacifica Salud Hospital Punta Pacifica, in Panama City
 Tokyo Midtown Medical Center, Japan

Strategic Collaborations
JHMI provides educational and consulting support to:

Monterrey Institute of Technology and Higher Education, Mexico
Medcan Clinic, Canada
Cardiocentro, Brazil
San Matteo Hospital, Italy
Trinidad and Tobago Health Sciences Institute, Trinidad and Tobago

References

Johns Hopkins Medical Institutions